Lieutenant General Sir Carl Herman Jess,  (16 February 1884 – 16 June 1948) was an Australian Army officer who served in the First and Second World Wars.

Early life and career
Carl Herman Jess was born on 16 February 1884 in the city of Bendigo, Victoria, to George Jess, a master German painter, and his wife, Mary, an immigrant from Ireland. One of nine children, he was educated at Violet Street State School in Bendigo. From 1899 to 1906, he worked at the school as a teacher.

In 1899, Jess joined the First Victorian Volunteer Cadets, rising to the rank of sergeant. In February 1902, he enlisted in the 5th Battalion of the Victorian Infantry, again rising quickly through the enlisted ranks to lance corporal and then in 1903, lance sergeant and then sergeant in 1904. On 7 June 1906, he resigned from the militia and the Victorian Education Department in order to take up a position with the Instructional Staff of the permanent forces.

Jess was promoted to sergeant major on 1 January 1907. On 1 July 1909, he was commissioned as a full lieutenant. On 1 January 1911 he was sent to New South Wales as brigade major of the 5th Infantry Brigade with the rank of temporary captain, the rank became permanent on 1 July 1912. While there, he studied the Diploma of Military Science at the University of Sydney. He returned to Victoria as brigade major of the 15th Infantry Brigade. On 13 December 1911 he became staff officer in charge of administering the Universal Training scheme in Victoria. Then on 1 July 1914, he became Deputy Assistant Adjutants General of the 4th Military District (South Australia).

First World War
On the outbreak of the First World War, Jess was involved in the mobilisation of the Australian Military Force (AMF) in South Australia, and then of the preparation of the South Australian contingent, the 10th Infantry Battalion and the 2nd Squadron, 3rd Light Horse Regiment. He joined the Australian Imperial Force himself in Melbourne on 23 September 1914, having been selected for the post of staff captain with the 4th Infantry Brigade by Colonel John Monash.

Jess landed at Anzac Cove on 25 April 1915 and served throughout the Gallipoli Campaign. He became brigade major of the 2nd Brigade on 23 May 1915 with the rank of major, serving with distinction in the front line, most notably alongside Lieutenant Colonel Bennett in the attack on the German Officers' Trench on 7 August 1915. He was well known by Australian Diggers for his courage at Gallipoli and his cool head in the face of extraordinary circumstances. For his service at Gallipoli, he was Mentioned in Despatches and 1916 was awarded the Order of the White Eagle by the King of Serbia.

Jess returned to Egypt on 7 January 1916. On 28 February 1916 he was given command of the 7th Battalion, and was promoted to lieutenant colonel on 12 March 1916. At Pozières in July 1916 he again distinguished himself as a front-line leader. He was gassed at Pozières and refused to leave his post and for this he was twice Mentioned in Despatches and awarded the Distinguished Service Order (DSO) on 1 January 1917.

On 19 November 1916 Jess was appointed first commandant of the I Anzac Corps School but on 27 November he was recalled to temporarily command 2nd Brigade. From 13 March 1917 to 8 September 1917, he was an instructor at the School for Commanding Officers at Aldershot, England, the first Australian officer to hold such an appointment.

On 8 September 1917, Jess was appointed the task of GSO2 at I Anzac Corps Headquarters. Then on 7 January 1918 he became GSO1 at 2nd Division Headquarters. On 20 January 1918, he transferred to the 3rd Division Headquarters. Jess was promoted to major in the AMF on 1 January 1918, lieutenant colonel on 3 June 1918, colonel and temporary brigadier general on 7 October 1918, taking over the 10th Infantry Brigade. For his service on the Western Front in the final year of war, he was again mentioned in despatches and appointed a Companion of the Order of St Michael and St George (CMG) in the 1919 New Year's List.

Jess took over the AIF Training Depot at Codford, England in March 1919 and in July, he became Commandant of the AIF Administrative Headquarters in London. Jess replaced Monash as Director General of Repatriation, and then General Sir William Birdwood as General Officer Commanding AIF, he finally completed the AIF's affairs overseas in January 1920. For this work, he was appointed a Commander of the Order of the British Empire (CBE).

Between the wars
On termination of his AIF appointment on 21 January 1920, Jess reverted to his permanent rank of lieutenant colonel. He attended the Staff College at Camberley, and after the birth of his first son, Carl McGibbon Jess in 1921, he returned to Australia, receiving a civic welcome from his home town of Bendigo.

Jess became a staff officer with the 4th Division in May 1921. His second son, John David Jess (Member House of Representatives and Federal Member for Latrobe Victoria 1960–1972) was born in Melbourne in 1922. In 1925, he became Commandant of the 6th Military District (Tasmania). He was promoted to  full colonel in 1926 and became commandant of the 5th Military District (Western Australia) in August 1927. He was promoted to brigadier in January 1929 and was aide-de-camp to the Governor General from 1931 to 1935. Jess was involved in organising the centennial celebrations in Western Australia and then in 1933 in Victoria. For this he was created a Knight Bachelor in the 1935 New Year's List.

In December 1934, Jess was appointed adjutant general, and became a member of the Military Board. He was promoted to the rank of major general in July 1935.

Second World War
With the outbreak of the Second World War, Jess was awarded the Companion of the Order of the Bath (CB) in June 1939, and promoted to lieutenant general on 12 December 1939. As Adjutant General, Jess had been appointed chairman of the Department of Defence's Manpower Committee in September 1938 and was responsible for greatly increasing the size of the militia. he relinquished this post to Major General Blamey. When Blamey was appointed to command the 6th Division in September 1939, Jess transferred from Adjutant General to this post.

Jess retained the post until March 1944. He became Director of Women's National Services (AWAS) in 1943 and organised the Australian Women's Land Army. With a strength of over 3,000, this organisation employed women on jobs throughout Australia.

Later life
After leaving the Department of Labour and National Service in March 1944, Jess became involved in a survey and classification of army records, compiling a report of the activities of the AMF from 1929 to 1939. His work was unfinished when he went on sick leave in July 1945. On 1 April 1946 he was placed on the retired list. He died at the Heidelberg Repatriation Hospital in Melbourne on 16 June 1948 and was cremated with full military honours.

Jess was also a prolific artist; when he joined the Victorian Volunteer Cadets in 1899, he started making artworks of the uniforms of various units. Shortly before his death, Jess' watercolour paintings of 19th- and 20th-century Australian and British military uniforms were purchased by the Australian War Memorial in Canberra. His hand carved and painted models of military figures were exhibited and housed at the Royal Military College, Duntroon. They were subsequently shown at the Shrine of Remembrance in Melbourne and are now in private collections in Melbourne.

References

Further reading

External links
 

1884 births
1948 deaths
Australian generals
Australian military personnel of World War I
Australian Army personnel of World War II
Australian Commanders of the Order of the British Empire
Australian Companions of the Distinguished Service Order
Australian Companions of the Order of St Michael and St George
Australian Companions of the Order of the Bath
Knights Bachelor
People from Bendigo
Australian people of German descent
20th-century deaths from tuberculosis
Infectious disease deaths in Victoria (Australia)
Tuberculosis deaths in Australia
Military art
Military personnel from Victoria (Australia)
Graduates of the Staff College, Camberley